The 2021 Hankook 24 Hours of Sebring was the first running of the 24 Hours of Sebring, an endurance race taking place at the Sebring International Raceway on 20 and 21 November 2021. It was the final round of the 2021 24H GT and TCE Series. The race was won by Michael Doppelmayr, Swen Herberger, Pierre Kaffer and Markus Winkelhock in the #18 Rutronik Racing by TECE Audi R8 LMS Evo.

Schedule
The initial schedule was shortened due to shipping delays and the start of the race moved from Friday to Saturday; the race is due to start at 5pm local time.

Entry list
24 cars were entered into the event; 18 GT cars and 6 TCEs.

Results

Qualifying
Fastest in class in bold.

Race
Class winner in bold.

References

External links

24 Hours of Sebring
24 Hours of Sebring
Sebring
2021 in 24H Series